This article is about the particular significance of the year 1790 to Wales and its people.

Incumbents
Lord Lieutenant of Anglesey - Henry Paget 
Lord Lieutenant of Brecknockshire and Monmouthshire – Henry Somerset, 5th Duke of Beaufort
Lord Lieutenant of Caernarvonshire - Thomas Bulkeley, 7th Viscount Bulkeley
Lord Lieutenant of Cardiganshire – Wilmot Vaughan, 1st Earl of Lisburne
Lord Lieutenant of Carmarthenshire – John Vaughan  
Lord Lieutenant of Denbighshire - Richard Myddelton  
Lord Lieutenant of Flintshire - Sir Roger Mostyn, 5th Baronet 
Lord Lieutenant of Glamorgan – John Stuart, Lord Mountstuart
Lord Lieutenant of Merionethshire - Watkin Williams
Lord Lieutenant of Montgomeryshire – George Herbert, 2nd Earl of Powis
Lord Lieutenant of Pembrokeshire – Richard Philipps, 1st Baron Milford
Lord Lieutenant of Radnorshire – Edward Harley, 4th Earl of Oxford and Earl Mortimer (until 11 October)

Bishop of Bangor – John Warren
Bishop of Llandaff – Richard Watson
Bishop of St Asaph – Samuel Hallifax (until 4 March); Lewis Bagot (from 28 April)
Bishop of St Davids – Samuel Horsley

Events

18 May - The first meeting of the Literary Fund, founded by David Williams ("to assist indigent authors") takes place in London.
9 June - Royal assent is given to establishment of the port of Milford Haven.
August - Construction of the Glamorganshire Canal begins.
exact date unknown
Sir Herbert Mackworth gives up the Parliamentary seat of Cardiff when John Stuart, Lord Mount Stuart, comes of age.
The world's first railway viaduct (used by horse-drawn wagons to carry coal from the mines) is built at Blaenavon. 
Monmouth County Gaol is built.
Calvinistic Methodist clergyman Thomas Charles of Bala attempts to preach at Corwen but is driven out of town by a mob.
John Coles, son of the founder of the Cambrian Pottery, goes into partnership with entrepreneur George Haynes, resulting in the expansion of the business.

Arts and literature

New books
Thomas Edwards (Twm o'r Nant) - Gardd o Gerddi
Thomas Pennant - Indian Zoology
David Williams - Lessons to a Young Prince (published anonymously)
Peter Williams - Tafol i Bwyso Sosiniaeth

Births

27 January - William Davies Evans, mariner and chess player (died 1872)
July - James Williams, cleric and co-founder of the Anglesey Association of the Preservation of Lives from Shipwreck (died 1872) 
20 February (baptised) - Hugh Hughes, painter (died 1863)
19 June - John Gibson, sculptor (died 1866)
4 July - George Everest, surveyor and geographer (died 1866)
11 August - William Probert, minister and author (died 1870)
16 September - Thomas Vowler Short, Bishop of St Asaph (died 1872)
29 September - John Jones, printer (died 1855)
date unknown - Owen Jones Ellis Nanney (born Ellis Jones), MP (died 1870), father of Sir Hugh Ellis-Nanney
probable - Thomas Penson (the younger), architect and surveyor (died 1859)

Deaths
4 March - Samuel Hallifax, Bishop of St Asaph, 57
20 March - Thomas Richards of Coychurch, cleric and lexicographer, 80
24 August - John Worgan, organist and composer, 66
11 October - Edward Harley, 4th Earl of Oxford and Earl Mortimer, Lord Lieutenant of Radnorshire, 64
16 October - Daniel Rowland, Methodist leader, c.79
5 November - Michael Lort, clergyman, academic and antiquary, 65

References

Wales
Wales